Villa Galicia is a small city in the state/region of Buenos Aires, Argentina which is located in the continent/region of South America. It was named after Galicia (Spain).
Cities, towns and places near Villa Galicia include Jose Marmol, Marmol, Turdera and Temperley. The closest major cities include La Plata, Montevideo, Rosario and Mar del Plata.

Populated places in Buenos Aires Province